Thomas Joseph Lobsinger (born 17 November 1927 in Ayton, Ontario) was a Canadian clergyman and bishop for the Roman Catholic Diocese of Whitehorse. He was ordained in 1954. He was appointed in 1987. He retired in 2000.

References 

Canadian Roman Catholic bishops
1927 births
2000 deaths